Arroyo Seco may refer to:

Places

Mexico
 Arroyo Seco Municipality
 Arroyo Seco, Querétaro

United States
 Arroyo Seco, New Mexico, an unincorporated community in Taos County, New Mexico
 El Valle de Arroyo Seco, New Mexico, a census designated place in Santa Fe County, New Mexico
 Arroyo Seco (Alameda County), a watercourse in Alameda County, California
 Arroyo Seco (Los Angeles County), a watercourse in Los Angeles County, California
 Arroyo Seco (Salinas River), a watercourse in Monterey County, California
 Arroyo Seco AVA, California wine region in Monterey County
 Arroyo Seco Creek, a watercourse in Sonoma County, California
 Arroyo Seco Junior High School, a middle school in Santa Clarita, California
 Arroyo Seco Parkway, the first California freeway
 Arroyo Seco Raceway, a paved racetrack near Deming, New Mexico

Other places
 Arroyo Seco, Santa Fe, Argentina
 Arroyo Seco, a barrio of Montevideo, Uruguay

Events 
Arroyo Seco Fight, a skirmish between Texians and Comanche Indians in Texas in 1838.

See also
 Arroyo (creek), a dry creek or stream bed—gulch